The Empty Planet is a two-part story of the fourth series of the British science fiction television series The Sarah Jane Adventures, which was  broadcast on CBBC on 1 and 2 November 2010. It is the fourth story of the fourth series.

In the story, Clyde Langer and Rani Chandra, two alien investigators, try to figure out why they seem to be the only people left on Earth.

Plot
The king of a distant planet had a son in Ealing called Gavin. To give Gavin a normal life he gave him a ring called a bio-damper to wear. Gavin's human mother died before she could tell him about who he is.

One morning, when Gavin is 13, a message about Gavin becoming king after his father's death fails to reach him because of his bio-damper. As a result nearly all of the humans on Earth, along with moving vehicles, are removed and suspended so that two royal robots can find Gavin and return him to his planet. Clyde and Rani are also left behind as the Judoon prohibited them from leaving Earth. After meeting up, Clyde and Rani head into town to look for someone besides them. In town, they spot Gavin and follow him to a block of flats. Rani tells Gavin about aliens to try to gain his trust. Gavin is sceptical, but before they can persuade him to help, a strange noise is heard and he slips away whilst Clyde and Rani try to work out what it was.

The robots catch up with them, and tell them they are looking for their world's son and heir. Clyde and Rani find Gavin at the nature reserve he wrote about in his diary and have him remove the bio-damper which hides him from the robots. The robots send him the information again and show him the planet he is meant to rule. He agrees to go and orders the robots to return everyone to Earth. Mr Smith fixes the records so that the public will think that Gavin has officially moved to Australia.

Production
As in The Mark of the Berserker, Sarah Jane is only briefly seen. With Luke and K9 off at Oxford, Rani and Clyde are the principal characters, with one or both appearing in every scene.

Notes

References

External links

2010 British television episodes
The Sarah Jane Adventures episodes
Films with screenplays by Gareth Roberts (writer)